Mayapuri is a locality in Bongaigaon, surrounded by localities of Paglasthan, Borpara and Chapaguri with nearest railway station, New Bongaigaon railway station at New Bongaigaon.

Recreational facilities
Mayapuri Cinema is in the area, plus main shopping centre of the city like Sharma Store, Sri Karni Store, Megabrands, Sajawat, Prabha, Shobha Electronics, Shivali Market makes this place important.

See also
 Paglasthan
 Borpara, Bongaigaon
 Chapaguri, Bongaigaon
 Dhaligaon
 New Bongaigaon

References

Neighbourhoods in Bongaigaon